Rintala is a Finnish surname. Notable people with the surname include:

 Toivo Rintala (1876–1953), Finnish consumers' co-operative manager and politician
 Paavo Rintala (1930–1999), Finnish novelist and theologian
 Rudy Rintala (1909-1999), American four-sport collegiate athlete and hall-of-famer at Stanford University
 Sami Rintala (born 1969), Finnish architect and artist
 Teemu Rintala, Finnish sport shooter

Finnish-language surnames